Bugak is a variety of vegetarian twigim (deep-fried dish) in Korean cuisine. It is made by deep frying dried vegetables or seaweed coated with chapssal-pul (glutinous rice paste) and then drying them again. It is eaten as banchan (accompaniment to cooked rice) or anju (accompaniment to alcoholic beverages). Common ingredients are green chili peppers, perilla leaves, inflorescence, camellia leaves, chrysanthemum leaves, burdock leaves, tree of heaven shoots, potatoes, gim (laver), and dasima (kelp). Vegetable oils such as perilla oil or soybean oil are typically used for frying.

Bugak is a relatively rare culinary technique in Korean cuisine, along with dasima twigak (deep fried vegetables without coating). It is often associated with Korean temple cuisine.

Varieties 
 dangeun-bugak – made with carrots 
 dasima-bugak – made with kelp 
 deulkkae-songi-bugak – made with perilla inflorescence 
 dongbaek-ip-bugak – made with camellia leaves 
 dureup-bugak – made with angelica tree shoots 
 eumnamu-sun-bugak – made with castor aralia shoots 
 gajuk-bugak – made with tree of heaven shoots 
 gamja-bugak – made with potatoes 
 gamnnip-bugak – made with persimmon leaves 
 gim-bugak – made with laver 
 gochu-bugak – made with green chili peppers 
 gukhwa-ip-bugak – made with chrysanthemum leaves 
 kkaennip-bugak – made with perilla leaves 
 mosi-ip-bugak – made with ramie leaves 
 ogapi-ip-bugak – made with eleuthero leaves 
 parae-bugak – made with green laver 
 ssuk-bugak – made with Korean mugwort 
 ueong-ip-bugak – made with burdock

Gallery

See also 

 Twigak
 Korean temple cuisine

References 

Deep fried foods
Korean vegetable dishes